Norway Lake is a lake in Kandiyohi County, in the U.S. state of Minnesota. A majority of the early settlers near the lake being natives of Norway caused the name to be selected.

See also
List of lakes in Minnesota

References

Lakes of Minnesota
Lakes of Kandiyohi County, Minnesota